The Protocol on Heavy Metals, a protocol to the Convention on Long-Range Transboundary Air Pollution, was adopted in Aarhus, Denmark in 1998. As of 2004, it had 36 signatories. As of 2016, it had 35 signatories and 33 parties, with no country having become a signatory since 1998. The protocol addresses the reduction of cadmium, lead and mercury emissions in the interests of environmental protection. Amendments to the Protocol were agreed in 2012 to introduce more stringent emission limits but are not yet in force.

References

Bibliography

Politics in Aarhus
1998 in law
1998 in Denmark
Environmental protection
Toxic effects of metals